Yasmany Lugo (born 24 January 1990) is a Cuban Greco-Roman wrestler. He won the silver medal at the 2016 Summer Olympics in the men's Greco-Roman 98 kg category.

References

External links
 

1990 births
Living people
People from Pinar del Río
Cuban male sport wrestlers
Olympic wrestlers of Cuba
Wrestlers at the 2016 Summer Olympics
Olympic silver medalists for Cuba
Olympic medalists in wrestling
Medalists at the 2016 Summer Olympics
Pan American Games gold medalists for Cuba
Wrestlers at the 2015 Pan American Games
Pan American Games medalists in wrestling
Medalists at the 2015 Pan American Games
21st-century Cuban people